Niphona batesi is a species of beetle in the family Cerambycidae. It was described by Charles Joseph Gahan in 1895.

References

batesi
Beetles described in 1895